Monica Anja Dahl-Böhm (born 10 July 1975) is a Namibian swimmer. Of German descent, Dahl competed at the 1992 Summer Olympics and 1996 Summer Olympics for Namibia. She was one of the first Namibian athletes to compete in the Olympics, and the first woman to represent the nation at the Olympics.

References

External links

1975 births
Living people
White Namibian people
Namibian people of German descent
Namibian female swimmers
Olympic swimmers of Namibia
Swimmers at the 1992 Summer Olympics
Swimmers at the 1996 Summer Olympics
Swimmers at the 1994 Commonwealth Games
Commonwealth Games competitors for Namibia
African Games medalists in swimming
African Games bronze medalists for Namibia
Competitors at the 1991 All-Africa Games